The economy of Arkansas produced US$119 billion of gross domestic product in 2015. Six Fortune 500 companies are based in Arkansas, including the world's #1 corporation by revenue, Walmart. Arkansas's per capita income for 2010 was $36,027. The three-year median household income from 2009-11 was $39,806, ranking forty-ninth in the nation.

According to CNBC, Arkansas currently ranks as the 35th best state for business, with the 10th-lowest cost of doing business, 8th-lowest cost of living, 41st best workforce, 29th-best economic climate, 41st-best educated workforce, 41st-best infrastructure and the 32nd-friendliest regulatory environment. Arkansas gained twelve spots in the best state for business rankings since 2011.

Arkansas ranks as one of the top states for charitable giving. In 2011, Arkansans gave 6.3% of their discretionary income to charity, ranking it as the seventh-most generous state. The Pine Bluff metropolitan area ranked as the seventh-most charitable metro area in the nation during the same time period.

Exports
The state's 2011 exports totaled $5.6 billion. Civilian aircraft was the primary export from Arkansas in 2011 in terms of market share, worth approximately half a billion dollars. Poultry, cotton, rice, graders, ammunition, organic chemicals, steel, and shock absorbers are also important exports from Arkansas. Dassault Falcon Jet Corporation in Little Rock is one of the largest foreign-owned corporations in Arkansas.

Arkansas's primary exporting partners in 2011 included Canada (24.9%), Mexico (12.1%), China (7.4%), Japan (3.8%), South Korea (3.5%), France (3.0%), and Singapore (3.0%).

The state also ranks third in terms of channel catfish aquaculture, with about  under catfish farming in 2010. The peak of catfish farming in the state was in the year 2002, when  were under farming.  In 2007, the state's catfish producers generated sales of $71.5 million – 16 percent of the total U.S. market. Arkansas was the first state to develop commercial catfish farms in the late 1950s. The number of catfish farms in the state grew through the 1990s as farmers entered the catfish business as a way to provide additional income during a time of low prices for cotton and soybeans.

Arkansas's largest companies

Public companies
The following table lists the public companies headquartered in Arkansas with 2017 revenues placing them in the Fortune 1000 largest U.S. companies.

Private companies
The following table lists the only privately held companies headquartered in Arkansas with 2011 revenues over $1 billion.

Energy

Production

Arkansas produced  in 2007, mostly from coal, petroleum, nuclear, and renewable energy sources. In 2007, 46.2% of Arkansas's energy production was from natural gas, 27.6% from nuclear power, 19.9% from renewable sources, 6.2% from fossil fuels. Arkansas imports petroleum for use in the transportation sector but is a net exporter of electric power, selling  to the national electric grid in 2007. The rural nature of Arkansas causes Arkansans to spend more on energy than the national average. Due to transmission, 65% of electricity was lost on its way to consumers in 2007. The state's low population density results in higher electricity costs and more gallons of fuel used per vehicle. Arkansas consumes more natural gas and renewable energy and less fossil fuels than the national average.

Petroleum production in Arkansas began with a boom in the early 1920s in southern Arkansas. Largely produced by Union, Lafayette, Columbia, and Ouachita counties, the boom began when the Busey Well No. 1 was completed on January 10, 1921. The region, especially El Dorado and Smackover, oil production exploded into a large part of the Arkansas economy. Today, petroleum is a minor piece of the state economy, yet the industry remains one of the largest employers in the region. Today, remnants of the oil boom include Murphy Oil, a gasoline retailer and Arkansas Museum of Natural Resources, which informs visitors of the history of oil in the area. Two refineries, the El Dorado Refinery and the Smackover Refinery produce a combined .

Natural gas has become an important source of energy and economic activity in north central Arkansas. Hydraulic fracturing in the Fayetteville Shale has impacted much of the region's economy, including Cleburne, Conway, Faulkner, Van Buren, and White counties. The state ranked 12th in terms of marketed production of natural gas in 2007. However, health and environmental concerns, including the possible responsibility for earthquakes called the Guy-Greenbrier earthquake swarm have slowed the continued development of activity in the region.

Although accounting for a small portion of Arkansas's energy production mixture, coal reserves are being mined in the state. Coal is mostly located in the Arkansas River Valley in western Arkansas. The state has significant lignite deposits as well. Arkansas coal has very low sulfur content compared to national averages.

Renewable energy plays an important role in Arkansas's energy production and consumption cycle. The state's energy mix included 10% renewables, compared to a national average of 5.7%, in 2007. Hydroelectric power is the state's largest source of renewable energy. Dams such as Beaver, Bull Shoals, Greers Ferry, and Dardanelle Lock and Dam all have capability of producing hydroelectric power. Although Arkansas ranks 27th nationally in wind energy potential, the state has few wind turbines installed. However, the world's largest turbine blade manufacturer, LM Wind Power and Nordex, a turbine component company have both added facilities in the state.

Oil and Gas
Arkansas is ranked 43rd in oil production and 40th in natural gas production among the states in 2020. Oil and Gas production provides thousand of jobs in Arkansas. The jobs include including exploration, drilling, production, transportation, and refining.

State taxes
Arkansas imposes a state income tax with six brackets, ranging from 1.0% to 7.0%. The first $9,000 of military pay of enlisted personnel is exempt from Arkansas tax; officers do not have to pay state income tax on the first $6,000 of their military pay. Retirees pay no tax on Social Security, or on the first $6,000 in gain on their pensions along with recovery of cost basis. Residents of Texarkana, Arkansas are exempt from Arkansas income tax; wages and business income earned there by residents of Texarkana, Texas are also exempt. Arkansas's gross receipts (sales) tax and compensating (use) tax rate is currently 6%. The state has also mandated that various services be subject to sales tax collection. They include wrecker and towing services; for-hire transportation; dry cleaning and laundry; body piercing, tattooing and electrolysis; pest control; security and alarm monitoring; self-storage facilities; boat storage and docking; and pet grooming and kennel services.

Along with the state sales tax, there are more than 300 local taxes in Arkansas. Cities and counties have the authority to enact additional local sales and use taxes if they are passed by the voters in their area. These local taxes have a ceiling or cap; they cannot exceed $25 for each 1% of tax assessed. These additional taxes are collected by the state, which distributes the money back to the local jurisdictions monthly. Low-income taxpayers with a total annual household income of less than $12,000 are permitted a sales tax exemption for electricity usage.

Sales of alcoholic beverages account for added taxes. A 10% supplemental mixed drink tax is imposed on the sale of alcoholic beverages (excluding beer) at restaurants. A 4% tax is due on the sale of all mixed drinks (except beer and wine) sold for "on-premises" consumption. A 3% tax is due on beer sold for off-premises consumption.

Property taxes are assessed on real and personal property; only 20% of the value is used as the tax base.

References

External links
Arkansas Economic Development Commission
Arkansas Small Business and Technology Development Center